Bolesławiec is a railway station in the town of Bolesławiec, Lower Silesia, Poland.

Train services
Train services are operated by Polregio and Koleje Dolnośląskie.

Until mid-December 2014 the station was also served by EuroCity "Wawel", which used to run once daily between Berlin Hauptbahnhof and Wrocław Główny.

The station is served by the following service(s):

 Intercity services (IC) Zgorzelec - Legnica - Wrocław - Ostrów Wielkopolski - Łódź - Warszawa

References

External links
 
 Przewozy Regionalne website 

Railway stations in Lower Silesian Voivodeship